Qualification for the 2015 FIBA Asia Championship was held to determine the participants in the 2015 FIBA Asia Championship.  secured qualification by being named as hosts. The other fifteen berths were disputed per FIBA Asia zone, and via the 2014 FIBA Asia Cup.

Qualification format
The following are eligible to participate:

 The organizing country.
 The champion team from the previous FIBA Asia Cup.
 The four best-placed teams from the previous FIBA Asia Cup will qualify the same number of teams from their respective sub-zones.
 The two best teams from the sub-zones of East Asia, Gulf, Southeast Asia and West Asia and the winner from the sub-zones of South Asia and Central Asia.

Qualified teams

FIBA Asia Cup 

The 2014 FIBA Asia Cup was held at Wuhan, Hubei, China from 11 to 19 July 2014.

 The host nation was not yet determined at the conclusion of the tournament. China was chosen as the hosts a week later.

Central Asia
The Central Asia qualifiers was a one-game playoff between Kazakhstan and Kyrgyzstan in Astana.

East Asia 
The 4th East Asian Basketball Championship was cancelled as no countries were willing to host it.

The participation of Japan was dependent if FIBA lifts its suspension in time for the draw.

Gulf

The 14th Gulf Basketball Championship was held at Dammam, Saudi Arabia from 13 to 20 October 2014.

South Asia

The 4th SABA Championship was held at Bengaluru, India from 3 to 5 July 2015.

Southeast Asia

The 11th SEABA Championship was held at Singapore from 27 April to 1 May 2015.

West Asia
The WABA Championship was held at Orthodox Club Arena, Amman from 29 May to 2 June 2015. As original hosts  were already qualified by winning the 2014 FIBA Asia Cup, they gave up hosting the tournament and withdrew. Lebanon, Jordan and Palestine qualified.

References

qualification
FIBA Asia Cup qualification
FIBA